Eriko Mukoyama, known as Anyango, is a female nyatiti player.

Biography 

 In 1981, Eriko Mukoyama was born in Tokyo.
 In 2001, she boarded a plane for New York City to learn music. But her plane was forced to return to Japan, because the day was September 11. She then went to the Kenyan traditional music concert in Tokyo, and its beat has changed her life.
 Normally only men play the Nyatiti, so she was allowed to play the instrument and became known as the first female Nyatiti player in the world.
 She has been named as an inspiration by Kenyan Suzanna Owiyo, who has taken up the nyatiti.

Activities
 In 1981, she was born in Tokyo. Since high school, she has been aiming to become a singer and started her musical activities as a leader and vocalist of her band "Taika."
 In 2001, she went to the United States for music training, but encountered the day of September 11 attacks and abandoned her training in the United States and returned to Japan. She found her musical direction in the Kenyan music she happened to meet in Japan and devoted herself to practicing her percussion.
 In 2004, she went to Kenya to study music, ignoring the opposition of the people around her. While searching for a balance between a singer and an instrument, she fatefully meets the Nyatiti, a Luo folk instrument.
 In March 2005, she traveled from Japan to Kenya and began practicing the Nyatiti in Nairobi. Unsatisfied, she decides to live alone in a village called the birthplace of the Nyatiti and begin her training in the Nyatiti. In May 2005, she arrived in a village in West Kenya, begging a Nyatiti master to become a disciple, but she refused. Because the Nyatiti was a sacred instrument that only selected men of the Luo people could play. The name of the Nyatiti master is Okum K'Orengo. He declined her offer repeatedly. But he finally allowed her to live in the village. Training of the Nyatiti by herself has begun. In July 2005, he saw her enthusiastic appearance and began teaching the Nyatiti. His practice was getting harder and harder day by day. As the Nyatiti improved, she became known as Okum's daughter, Siaya's daughter. On November 26, 2005, a certification test was held in the village to recognize her as a traditional Nyatiti player. The concert was attended by elders from the villages of Luo and several Nyatiti masters. At that certification, she became the first woman in the world to be allowed to play the Nyatiti.
 In 2007, as a Japanese woman playing the Nyatiti and singing in Dholuo, she became famous in Kenya after being widely reported on Kenyan TV, radio, and newspapers. The Kenya Tourism Board has appointed her as a " Kenyan Japanese Cultural Goodwill Ambassador." She performed at a UN ceremony in front of African leaders for the third consecutive year.
 In July 2009, she was selected among "the 100 Japanese most respected people" in the Newsweek Japan. In September 2009, she released her first solo album titled "Nyatiti Diva."
 In May 2010, she released her second solo album titled "Horizon."In August 2010, she appeared on the stage at the Fuji Rock Festival, which is the largest outdoor music event in Japan. In December 2010, the second album "Horizon" was selected as one of "2010 CDJournal best disk 100" in CDJournal, which is the most famous music magazine in Japan.
 In February 2011, she left for France to make a new album. Sally Nyolo, who was a member of Zap Mama, produced this Album and recorded with Anyango at four places in France and Cameroon. In July, she released her CD "Koe wo Kikasete" and published a book "Motto Toku e." The book was ranked first in the music section of "Amazon Japan." In September, she will release her third album "Teï molo." In November, she appeared on TV Asahi's "Tetsuko's Room."
 In August 2012, she published a book, "Anyango no Shin-Yume wo Tsukamu Hosoku", which was ranked first in the non-fiction section of "Amazon Japan." In July, she visited France and performed in Paris and Bordeaux. In October, she performed in Izumo-taisha Grand Shrine, which is one of the most ancient shrines in Japan.
 In 2013, regular concert named "Anyango Promenade" was held in Japan. This event was also a memorial event of Kenya's 50th Independence Jubilee. In March, she performed at "Mvet Art Festival" in Strasbourg France. In May her interview was published in "Japan Journal", and she appeared on the cover of that issue. During her World Tour 2013, She performed in Italy, Germany, France, and Kenya. She had acted a radio personality of NHK WORLD Swahili for 3 years. A documentary of Anyango "Alluring African Music" was broadcast via NHK WORLD TV channel on June 1 and 2. All-acoustic solo mini-album "ALEGO ～Nyatiti no Furusato～" was released on October 6. 
 In November 2014 she made her first appearance in Uganda at the annual Milege World Music Festival in the Entebbe Botanical Gardens as part of her 2014 East Africa Tour. She released the fifth album "Kilimanjaro" on September 28.
 In August 2015, she performed at "Sing for Peace and Hope Concert" on the United Nations Peace Memorial Ceremony Hiroshima, Nagasaki, and Tokyo. and she released her sixth Album "Savanna" in autumn. 
 In August 2016, she released her best album "The Safari of Eriko Mukoyama" in Kenya,Tanzania,Uganda, and she released DVD "Anyango Live in Tokyo" in Japan. In addition, she performed at the reception parties of "TICAD VI" and "Hideyo Noguchi Africa Prize", which were held in Nairobi. She appeared on NHK BS1 "International report 2016 WORLD LOUNGE" on September 14.
 In 2017, her best album "The Safari of Eriko Mukoyama" was also released in Japan on January 1. She appeared on Mainichi Broadcasting System (TBS series) New Year special program "2017 Actually This Person. The World Only One" on January 2. And she has started to appear regularly in NHK Radio Swahili "NHK WORLD RADIO JAPAN." She appeared on NHK WORLD TV "Taking Tradition to the World" on February 3. In November, she was awarded "Higashi-Kuninomiya Culture Award" for her 10-year goodwill cultural contributions toward Japan and Kenya relationship. 
 In 2018, she appeared on NHK WORLD TV "Direct Talk" on May 22. She published a collection of essays, "Nyatiti No Uta" which describes the wonderfulness of life that she learned from interacting with Kenyan people, along with Nyatiti's music on December 10.
 In 2019, she released the world remix dance music "KAMBA NANE Anyango Club Remix", which was 7-inch record created by Japan, Cameroon, Kenya, and Senegal.
 On May 9, 2021, she released the first full-length album "KANKI" in five and a half years, was a new fusion of world music with Japanese Lyrics. And Anyngo's "KANKI" was ranked first in the new arrival ranking in the global music category of "Amazon Japan."

Discography

Nyatiti Diva

"Nyatiti Diva" released in September 2009, is her first album. 
All tunes are acoustic sound without electric, they are traditional Luo songs arranged by Anyango.
 Title: Nyatiti Diva
 Artist: Anyango
 Released: September 20, 2009
 Label: JOWI music
 Contents:
 Thum Nyatiti　
 Dodo
 Matatu ni notte　
 Janeko / Ja Ugenya (Live at Kericho)　
 Nabed nade gijo pinje　
 Koblo　
 Kimi no koe　
 seda (Live at Siaya)　
 Weche ng'eny　
 Nyadundo gacha ywak pile　
 Ne nyako ma go ogol ogol　
 Thum mora　
 Thum Nyatiti （Pakruok）

HORIZON

"HORIZON"  released in May 2010, is her second album. 
This album has evolved in more pop and groovier as accompanied with her back band and chorus. 
Some tunes are traditional Luo songs, except "Nkosi sikelel'i Afrika," arranged by Anyango, and some tunes are new songs written by her.
 Title: HORIZON
 Artist: ANYANGO
 Released: May 30, 2010
 Label: JOWI music
 Contents:
 Nkosi sikelel'i Afrika
 Ochieng Kochieng
 Horizon
 Koro aa
 To thumno ywak kanye?
 Kaze　～Nyatiti Tatu
 Sweet Poison
 Jacaranda
 Joseph Otieno
 Akai Daichi　　～Red Ground

Teï molo 

"Teï molo"  released in September 2011, is her third album.  
The mix of the bikutsi rhythm and the nyatiti rhythm will give birth to a new legend in World Music.

 Title: Teï molo
 Artist: Anyango
 Label: JOWI music
 Release: September 25, 2011
 Contents:
 Anyango
 Vyumba Vitano
 Bushman
 Do Ya?
 Teï molo
 Koro azen
 Lang lang
 Aye
 Pangui Dame
 Le vent
 Afro blue
 Te wa sili ma
 Bimbao
 Zen ining
 Mvet

ALEGO ～Nyatiti no Furusato～

"ALEGO"  released in October 2013, is her fourth album. 
"ALEGO" is a name of the Kenyan village where Anyango mastered the Nyatiti.

 Title: ALEGO ～Nyatiti no Furusato～
 Artist: Anyango
 Label: JOWI music
 Release: October 6, 2013
 Contents:
 Yashi no mi
 To thumno ywak kanye?
 Ja Ugenya
 Kimi no koe
 Seda
 Alego (Instrumental)
 Mungu ibariki Afrika

Kilimanjaro

"Kilimanjaro" released in September 2014, is her fifth album. 
It will show you a fusion of the African roots music and the current electro music, the West and the East, the fusion of versatile culture, and the kaleidoscopic music world.

 Title: Kilimanjaro
 Artist: Anyango
 Label: JOWI music
 Release: September 28, 2014
 Contents:
 Kizash
 Mwana wa mberi
 Kayamba
 Afro blue
 Last Waltz
 Ogwang
 Koe wo kikasete ～Kilimanjaro mix～
 Uhiki
 Shiva
 Amalele

Savanna

"Savanna" released in October 2015, is her sixth album. 
The first instrumental album of Nyatiti by her will invite you to the grand African earth.

 Title:Savanna
 Artist: Anyango
 Label: JOWI music
 Release: October 18, 2015
 Contents:
 Gaudensha
 Kariobangi
 Mashindano
 Savanna
 Flamingo
 After the Squall
 Old Violin
 Gaudensha II
 African Owl
 Meditation of Motherland

The Safari of Eriko Mukoyama

"The Safari of Eriko Mukoyama" is the first time for Anyango to officially release her album in Kenya and East Africa.

 Title:Anyango ～ The Safari of Eriko Mukoyama
 Artist: Anyango
 Label: Ketebul music / JOWI music
 Release: August 25, 2016
 Contents:
 Anyango nyar Japan meets Kenge Kenge
 Weche Ng'eny
 Sweet Poison
 Kizashi
 Ja Uganya
 Horizon
 Ogwang
 Flamingo
 Kayamba
 Gaudensha
 Uhiki
 Last Waltz
 Mwana wa Mberi
 Nyatiti Soran2020
 Jambo Nyatiti

Nyatiti Soran 2020

"Nyatiti Soran 2020" is a fusion of traditional Kenyan Nyatiti, traditional Japanese Soran-Bushi,and western dance music.

 Title:Nyatiti Soran 2020
 Artist: Anyango
 Label: JOWI music
 Release: April 1, 2017

KAMBA NANE

"KAMBA NANE" is her Club Remix 7-inch record. 
The World remix dance music was created by Japan, Cameroon, Kenya, and Senegal.

 Title:KAMBA NANE
 Artist: Anyango
 Label: JOWI music
 Release: September 8, 2019
 Contents:
 Side A: Ogwang' (ZDJ House Remix)　　
 Side B: Kizashi (HIFANA Remix feat.Latyr Sy)

KANKI

"KANKI"  released in May 2021, is the first full-length album in five and a half years by her.
"KANKI"is a new fusion of world music with Japanese Lyrics.

 Title:KANKI
 Artist: Anyango
 Label: JOWI music
 Release: May 9, 2021
 Contents:
 Kamba Nane Ga Hajimaru Yo
 Alego Eno Tegami
 Kimi To Bokku Sazameku Jiyuu
 Sekai Wa Tada Damari Sore Wo Miteita
 Bear Hunting
 Kibishi Hideri
 Kanki

References

 http://search.japantimes.co.jp/cgi-bin/fl20100516x1.html

External links
 anyango.com

Japanese women singers
Living people
Singers from Tokyo
Japan–Kenya relations
Year of birth missing (living people)